Girl from the North Country is a musical with a book by Conor McPherson using the songs of Bob Dylan. It is the second Broadway show to use Dylan's music after Twyla Tharp's The Times They Are a-Changin'.

Productions

The Old Vic & West End (2017) 
The production premiered at The Old Vic in London running from 8 July to 7 October 2017, directed by McPherson.

Following the success of The Old Vic production, it transferred into London's West End at the Noël Coward Theatre from 29 December 2017 for a limited 12-week run until 24 March 2018, with the majority of The Old Vic cast.

Off-Broadway (2018) 
The production made its North American premiere Off-Broadway at The Public Theater in New York from 30 September to 22 December 2018, featuring an American cast.

Toronto (2019) 
The show, featuring a new cast including Katie Brayben and Anna-Jane Casey, was mounted at the Royal Alexandra Theatre in Toronto from 28 September to 24 November 2019.

Broadway (2020) 
Girl from the North Country made its Broadway premiere at the Belasco Theatre, beginning previews on 7 February 2020 and opening on 5 March 2020. The COVID-19 pandemic shuttered Broadway theaters on 12 March 2020; Girl from the North Country resumed performances on 13 October 2021. On 12 January 2022, it was announced the show would play its final performance at the Belasco Theatre on January 23, with initial plans to reopen at a different Shubert house in the spring. The show subsequently reopened at the Belasco Theatre on 29 April 2022 for a limited engagement set to conclude on June 19. 

On May 16, 2022, it was announced that prior to re-opening, the Broadway production was filmed for a future public release. Producers Tristan Baker and Charlie Parsons remarked "We feel that now was the right time to capture this incredible production ... This was the right time with the right cast, and everything fell into place perfectly. This story is beautiful and deserves to be seen by audiences all over, even if they can't make it to the theater," while revealing that negotiations were underway to find a distributor.

Australia & New Zealand Tour (2022) 
In Australia and New Zealand, a 2022 touring production starred Lisa McCune, Helen Dallimore, Terence Crawford, Peter Kowitz, Grant Piro, Greg Stone and Peter Carroll.

UK/Ireland Tour (2022) 
Also in May 2022, casting was announced for the show's first tour of Ireland and the UK, and on 25 June 2022 the tour opened at the 3Olympia theatre in Dublin. Writer and director Conor McPherson said, "Collaborating with Bob Dylan has been a unique privilege for me. We have had an amazing journey opening on Broadway and in the West End but I feel particularly excited and moved to finally bring this work to my home town of Dublin and on tour around the UK."

The tour's last venues in 2023 were Norwich Theatre Royal, Leicester Curve, and New Wimbledon Theatre, the final performance 18th March. Critical reception was the same as the production had received on its first opening in 2017.

North American Tour (2023) 
Also in May 2022, Girl From the North Country announced that the North American Tour would launch in Fall of 2023 in Minneapolis, Minnesota at the historic Orpheum Theatre, which Dylan previously owned.

Plot

Duluth, Minnesota, a city on the shores of Lake Superior. It's the winter of 1934 and America is in the grip of the Great Depression.

The story is narrated by Dr. Walker, physician to the Laine family. Nick Laine is the proprietor of a rundown guesthouse. The bank is threatening to foreclose on the property and he is desperate to find a way to save his family from homelessness. His wife, Elizabeth, is suffering from a form of dementia which propels her from catatonic detachment to childlike, uninhibited outbursts which are becoming difficult to manage. Their children are Gene, who is in his early twenties, and their adopted daughter, Marianne, who is nineteen.

Marianne is five months pregnant and the identity of the father is a mystery she guards carefully. Nick is trying to arrange a marriage between Marianne and a local shoe mender, Mr. Perry, in order to secure her future. The social awkwardness is complicated by the fact that Marianne is a black girl living with a white family. She was abandoned in the guesthouse as a baby and brought up by Nick and Elizabeth.

Gene is unable to get a grip on his life, and veers between ambitions of becoming a writer and debilitating alcohol binges, a situation not helped when his sweetheart, Kate, announces she is marrying a man with better prospects.

Nick has become involved in a relationship with a resident of the guest house, Mrs. Neilsen, a widow who is waiting for her late husband's will to clear probate. They dream of a better future when her money comes through, although she scolds Nick for his constant pessimism.

Also staying at the house are a family, the Burkes. Mr. Burke lost his business in the crash. His wife, Laura, and his son, Elias, share a room upstairs. Elias has a learning disability and the family struggle to come to terms with their reduced state.

Late at night, during a storm, a self-styled reverend bible salesman, Marlowe, and a down-on-his-luck boxer, Joe Scott, arrive looking for shelter. The arrival of these characters is a catalyst, changing everything for everyone in the house.

Bob Dylan's songs

Nineteen Bob Dylan songs are performed by the cast throughout the production. Each is backed by instruments from the 1930s. The Original London Cast Recording was made at Abbey Road in August 2017, and released by Silvertone/Sony Music on CD in September 2017 and double vinyl in December 2017.

Songs include:

"Sign on the Window"
"Went to See the Gypsy"
"Tight Connection to My Heart (Has Anybody Seen My Love)"
"Slow Train"
"License to Kill"
"I Want You"
"Like a Rolling Stone"
"Make You Feel My Love"
"You Ain't Goin' Nowhere"
"Jokerman"
"Sweetheart Like You"
"True Love Tends to Forget"
"Girl from the North Country"
"Hurricane"
"Idiot Wind"
"Duquesne Whistle"
"Señor (Tales of Yankee Power)"
"Is Your Love in Vain?"
"Forever Young"

A 25-track, 2 CD collection of songs taken from Bob Dylan's original studio albums, entitled The Music Which Inspired Girl From The North Country: The Original Bob Dylan Recordings, was released in January 2018.

Reception
In a five star review The Guardian described it as a "remarkable fusion of text and music", comparing its use of multiple storylines to Arthur Miller's The American Clock, and its narrator to Thornton Wilder's Our Town. "McPherson has created an astonishingly free-flowing production and the 19-strong cast, which includes three musicians, is so uniformly strong it is tough to pick out individuals. (They) use Bob's Dylan's back catalogue to glorious effect."

The Independent said "The idea is inspired and the treatment piercingly beautiful," adding that "Two formidable artists have shown respect for the integrity of each other's work here and the result is magnificent."

The Evening Standard called it "Beguiling and soulful and quietly, exquisitely, heartbreaking. This is, in short, a very special piece of theatre."

The Sunday Express hailed the show as "A tribute and a triumph" and The Times declared it "An instant classic."

The Observer praised the play, calling it "One of the most transporting shows I have seen in years. I came away feeling that Dylan has been writing not a series of songs but an unfolding chronicle."

Variety called it "A loving homage with a neat turn of phrase and a tang in the air. When people sing, it's as if they pop the bonnets of their brains and let us look inside," concluding that "The blend slips down easy: enjoyable and soulful."

On the occasion of the West End transfer Richard Williams wrote in The Guardian "The great achievement of Girl from the North Country, Conor McPherson's musical based on the work of Bob Dylan, lies in the ability of the writer-director and his musical supervisor, Simon Hale, to find shades of meaning within some of the songs that would surely surprise even Dylan himself, a famously protean interpreter of his own creations."

The Times awarded the play five stars calling it "a show that transports the soul."

A five star review from the Financial Times said "It's original, beautiful and moving, combining the starkness of Steinbeck with haunting lyricism to create something restless, desperate, hopeful and sad."

The Telegraphs five star review stated that "Not very often, a piece of theatre comes along that radiates an ineffable magic. Conor McPherson's musical play, which premiered at the Old Vic last year and now transfers to the West End, and which draws on heavily reworked versions of familiar and obscure Bob Dylan songs, is one such show. It's not a perfect piece by any means, but the rare alchemy with which McPherson fuses a dustbowl drama set in Depression-era Minnesota with the keening mysticism of Dylan's back catalogue makes it almost glow."

The Sunday Express awarded the transfer five stars, saying "Bob Dylan's songs are so emotive and intense that they might well have overwhelmed the action. It's greatly to McPherson's credit that Girl From The North Country is such a compelling drama in its own right. McPherson has written a subtle and touching play about small town lives in middle America in the 1930s. The Great Depression has entered the very bones of the drifters and fugitives who end up in Nick's boarding house in Duluth, Minnesota. I hailed this show on its premiere last autumn. This well-deserved transfer should not be missed. It's the most powerful, affecting and original musical in London. And, yes, that includes Hamilton."

Dylan himself praised the show in an interview with historian Douglas Brinkley that was first printed in the New York Times:
Brinkley: It's too bad that just when the play Girl from the North Country, which features your music, was getting rave reviews, production had to shutter because of COVID-19. Have you seen the play or watched the video of it?
Dylan: Sure, I've seen it, and it affected me. I saw it as an anonymous spectator, not as someone who had anything to do with it. I just let it happen. The play had me crying at the end. I can't even say why. When the curtain came down, I was stunned. I really was. Too bad Broadway shut down because I wanted to see it again."

Cast and characters

Awards and nominations

Original London production

Original Off-Broadway production

Original Broadway production
The show opened on March 5, 2020. One week later, on March 12, 2020, New York City's stay-in-place order came into effect at 5:00pm EDT and all theatres had to shut down due to the COVID-19 pandemic. Some awards, such as the Drama Desk Awards, allowed shows that opened after February 19 to submit for consideration for the 2020-21 awards season instead. The production ultimately resumed performances in October 2021.

Film adaptation

On February 6, 2023, McPherson was set to direct and write the film adaptation with Olivia Colman, Woody Harrelson, Chloe Bailey and Tosin Cole cast as the leads.

References

External links 
 "Girl from the North Country at the Old Vic", teaching resources, July–October 2017

2017 plays
Plays set in Minnesota
West End plays
Off-Broadway plays
Bob Dylan
Jukebox musicals
Tony Award-winning musicals